Remasellus parvus, the swimming Florida cave isopod, is an isopod endemic to "4 caves in the Ochlockonee and Aucilla-Suwanee drainages of Florida", United States. It is the only species in the genus Remasellus.

References

Asellota
Cave crustaceans
Crustaceans of the United States
Freshwater crustaceans of North America
Monotypic crustacean genera